Balch Fieldhouse is a 4,000, at one point seating 7,000, seat multi-purpose arena in Boulder, Colorado.  It opened in 1937.  It was home to the University of Colorado Buffaloes basketball teams until the CU Events Center opened in 1979.

The Fieldhouse includes an annex that is home to the University of Colorado's Track and Field and Cross Country and Sports Information Offices. The fieldhouse is where the track and cross country teams meet for practice during the winter. Track meets are also regularly held by Colorado during the indoor track season. USATF also holds meets on the weekends for athletes participating in club track and field.

The past 3 years, in November it has played host to the Boulder Qualifier for FIRST Lego League, where about 40 teams compete for a chance to advance to the state tournament.

References 

 Buffzone.com (2016-01-17). "Balch Fieldhouse bowing out, ending a long run". The Denver Post. Retrieved 2020-03-30.
 "Facilities". University of Colorado Athletics. Retrieved 2020-03-30.

Defunct college basketball venues in the United States
Colorado Buffaloes basketball venues
Basketball venues in Colorado
College indoor track and field venues in the United States
Indoor track and field venues in the United States
Sports in Boulder, Colorado
Buildings and structures in Boulder, Colorado
Athletics (track and field) venues in Colorado